The Custos Rotulorum of County Limerick was the highest civil officer in County Limerick. The position was later combined with that of Lord Lieutenant of Limerick.

Incumbents

1673–1679 Roger Boyle, 1st Earl of Orrery
 C1704–?1720 George Evans (died 1720)
1769–1780 Thomas Southwell, 1st Viscount Southwell
1780–1818 Robert Deane, 1st Baron Muskerry
1818–1850 Windham Henry Quin, 2nd Earl of Dunraven and Mount-Earl 
For later custodes rotulorum, see Lord Lieutenant of Limerick

References

Limerick